Mausoleum of Abdullah ibn Ali Zayn al-Abidin is a mausoleum dedicated to Abdullah ibn Ali Zayn al-Abidin, grandson of Husayn ibn Ali. It is located at the Fouad Street in the Alexandria, Egypt.

Description
After the sedition of the killing of Husayn ibn Ali, Abdullah ibn Ali Zayn al-Abidin (died in 180 AH) travelled to Alexandria with his aunt Zainab bint Husayn ibn Ali and his companion Yacoub ibn Abdul Rahman ibn Mohammed.

This Mausoleum built in the Islamic style with a dome carved with parts of Ayat al-Kursi.

Gallery

References

Mausoleums in Egypt